Lecithocera ianthodes is a moth in the family Lecithoceridae. It was described by Edward Meyrick in 1931. It is found in the Indian states of Uttarakhand and Himachal Pradesh.

References

Moths described in 1931
Taxa named by Edward Meyrick
ianthodes